Villeneuvette is a commune in the Hérault department in the Occitanie region in southern France. It is close to the town of Clermont l'Hérault.

Villeneuvette is a small village made up of a group of buildings built in the 17th century to create a royal clothmaking factory and to provide accommodation for its workers. Apart from a hotel and restaurant, the buildings are now restricted to residential use, many for holiday purposes.

The creation of Villeneuvette was promoted in 1677 by Jean-Baptiste Colbert, the noted finance minister of King Louis XIV. It was one of his many initiatives to develop France's industrial base. The factory was powered hydraulically, the water being drawn from various water courses from existing basins. The factory was privately owned and produced cloth for the king, including uniforms for his armies. The factory was operational until 1955.

Since 1995, the village has been classified as a "Zone de Protection du Patrimoine et du Paysage", recognising the originality and importance of its heritage.

Since 2014, the site has been listed as monument historique by the French Ministry of Culture.

The original inscription above the gateway was "MANUFACTURE ROYALE" but this was later rather crudely changed by the Republic to "HONNEUR AU TRAVAIL" - Honour in work.

Population

See also
Communes of the Hérault department

References

External links

Ministry of Culture database entry for Ancienne cité manufacturière de Villeneuvette, including pictures

Communes of Hérault
1677 establishments in France